Peter Moskos is an American professor at John Jay College of Criminal Justice in the Department of Law, Police Science, and Criminal Justice Administration and the CUNY Graduate Center in the Department of Sociology. He is a former Baltimore Police Department officer. The son of military and Greek American sociologist Charles Moskos, he specializes in policing, crime, and punishment. Moskos was listed by The Atlantic as one of their "Brave Thinkers of 2011" for his book In Defense of Flogging. In Defense of Flogging proposes giving individuals convicted of a crime a choice between incarceration and corporal punishment.

Cop in the Hood 

Moskos wrote the award-winning 2008 book Cop in the Hood, describing his doctoral experiences of participant observation as a police officer in Baltimore's Eastern District from 1999 to 2001. Moskos, a Harvard graduate student raised in a white middle-class liberal household, describes his first-hand experiences with poverty and violent crime in the Baltimore Police Department's Eastern District which encompassed a predominantly African-American ghetto of East Baltimore.

In the book, Moskos argues in favor of reforming the criminal justice system and the legalization of drugs. After calling for drug legalization in a Washington Post op-ed, Moskos was criticized by Gil Kerlikowske, and the president of the International Association of Chiefs of Police, Russell B. Laine.

Corporal punishment 
Moskos second book advocated judicial corporal punishment (specifically, flogging) as a voluntary alternative to incarceration. One reviewer for The Economist responded by saying: "Perhaps the most damning evidence of the broken American prison system is that it makes a proposal to reinstate flogging appear almost reasonable. Almost".

References

External links 
 Professor Peter C. Moskos John Jay College of Criminal Justice
 Video (and audio) of interview/conversation with Moskos by Will Wilkinson on Bloggingheads.tv

Harvard University alumni
Baltimore Police Department officers
John Jay College of Criminal Justice faculty
Graduate Center, CUNY faculty
Princeton University alumni
American people of Greek descent
American people of German descent
Living people
1971 births